Pakka Kalla is a 1979 Indian Kannada film, directed by Y. R. Swamy and produced by C. V. L. Shastry and Y. R. Ashwathnarayana Rao. The film stars Srinath, Manjula, Ambareesh and Vajramuni in the lead roles. The film has musical score by Chellapilla Satyam. The story of the movie was loosely based on the 1976 Hindi movie Hera Pheri.

Cast

Srinath
Manjula
Ambareesh
Vajramuni
K. S. Ashwath
Chethan Ramarao
Rajanand
Prabhakar
Jr. Shetty
N. S. Rao
Somashekar
Ashwath Narayan
Sharapanjara Iyengar
Hosanagara Rajaram
Vishwanath
Rajendra Prasad
Master Rajesh
Leelavathi
Roopadevi
Naveena
Halam
Baby Rathna
Narasimharaju in Guest Appearance
Jr. Narasimharaju

Soundtrack

References

External links
 
 

1979 films
1970s Kannada-language films
Films scored by Satyam (composer)
Kannada remakes of Hindi films
Films directed by Y. R. Swamy